Sir Iain Charles Robert McCullough (31 July 1931 – 9 October 2018) was a British barrister and judge. He was a judge of the High Court of Justice (Queen's Bench Division) from 1981 to 1998.

References 

 https://www.ukwhoswho.com/view/10.1093/ww/9780199540891.001.0001/ww-9780199540884-e-25461

1931 births
2018 deaths
Knights Bachelor
Queen's Bench Division judges
Members of the Middle Temple